were rustic Japanese celebrations that can be classified into two types:  that developed as a musical accompaniment to rice planting observances, and the  dances that developed in conjunction with . The  celebrated for rice planting was performed by villagers either at the New Year or during the planting season in early summer. It was only in the 14th century that these dances were brought to the cities and incorporated into Noh theater, notably by the playwright and actor Kan'ami.

After being brought to the aristocrats,  flourished till the end of the Heian period (794–1185) and became the main performing art of the Kamakura period (1185–1333), as well as part of the performing arts of the Muromachi period (1336–1573).

Today it barely survives as a folk performing art.

 was closely linked with the native Japanese religion of Shinto.

Political aspect of 
In the late 11th century, Kyoto experienced  performances that attracted all classes of people, either as observers or as participants. Some of these events ended peacefully, while others descended into violence; however, all were characterized by parades of people dressed in colorful costumes while dancing and playing loud music.

 started as the music and dancing that performed in conjunction with field labor called . This form of rural entertainment evolved during the Heian period in response to diverse social, economic, political, and cultural movements. Two types of  had developed by the latter half of the period. The first was the entertainment that accompanied field labor, but with new elements: the increasingly dominant entertaining aspect and the growing interest shown by local nobles. The nobility desired to "dominate rural areas, to increase crops, and thereby to boost tax income from the countryside". The second originated in the Kyoto-area temples and shrines which started adding  to their sacred rites and services on account of the entertainment's growing popularity and its ability to attract large audiences.

With the 10th-century urban growth of Kyoto,  slowly dissociated itself from both the agricultural and religious context. For two centuries after the end of the 11th century,  was the most popular form of entertainment. He ordered that rice-planting should be carried out so that the activity could be viewed from the pavilion of the palace where she was staying. On that day, she looked down on the farmers as they worked the field and witnessed a  performance. This was a new element in that nobles were viewing the performances and enjoying the experience.

A new style developed, and has been called .  is a generic term for the processions that developed during the second half of the Heian period, when catastrophes repeatedly struck Kyoto and its environs. The original  of the rice fields continued to flourish in rural society and in fact still survives in many agricultural areas.

The fusion of the two types into a new form of entertainment originated with the developing relationship between the urban and rural societies of the time. The  festival at the Gion Shrine played a major role in bringing about this fusion. The festival was a major gathering of Kyoto citizens and peasants from surrounding villages. These assemblies, motivated by fear and superstition, easily took on a political or social perspective in times of dissatisfaction, and became a rallying point for support of future political developments. As a result,  obtained a significance far beyond its original ritual, religious, and artistic merits.

The end of the 11th century was witness to the end of the  system of government and the beginning of the  form. The  system began in 1086, with the Emperor Shirakawa taking local control following his abdication. The new type of government took advantage of the public interest in  shown by the growing participation of the masses in religious, political, and cultural affairs. With the Great  movement, the  government strove to prove its independence of the  system.  was an effective means to obtain that goal.

and "Folklorism"
Folklorism is "folklore on display, mainly for purposes of tourism or cultural preservation". The presentation of Japan's folk performing arts occur frequently "out-of-context" at a number of events for folk-culture and tourism where context is "taken to mean local Shinto or Buddhist festivals and ceremonials".

Thornbury (1995) indicates that the study of folk performing arts began in the late 1920s and is "an important area of inquiry both in folklore research and in research on the performing arts in general". She noted that often the studies that came out of these two fields of research had little to do with each other or the realities of the folk performing arts as they currently exist. One exception was the work of Yamaji Kōzō, which identified seven patterns to describe how performances could be rooted in communities. The seven patterns identify a historic basis for understanding the relationship between folk performing arts and associated regions: showing the significance of the folk performing arts in the cultural history of Japan. Yamaji directly mentions  in the second and third patterns.

Yamaji's second pattern, covering the late 12th to late 16th centuries, when provincial manors were established by the nobles and by powerful religious complexes that introduced festivals like those held in Kyoto to honor their deities. Some performers were sent from the capital but most developed locally. The , which began in 1136, is one of the best documented of Japan's folk performing arts events and is an example of this pattern.

Performers with professional experience in these particular performing arts were hired to teach the priests and youths-in-training at the temples.

While Yamaji's analysis cannot account for every form of folk performing art, the evidence for a large portion is insufficient for certainty but it does dismiss the notion that folk performing arts are originally local creations. This is not to say that every folk performing art was born in a cultural capital:  is one exception that is frequently mentioned.

Carnival aspect
, or Drunken Demon, is "one of the most famous and popular  legends in medieval Japanese literature". According to the legend, Shuten Dōji (overlord of the ) and his followers were "abducting and devouring young Kyoto maidens" and warriors were sent by the imperial court to destroy them. The warriors, helped by attending deities, carried out this mission: rescuing the survivors and restoring peace to the land. Carnivalesque literature "inverts power structures, demystifying and lampooning that which a particular culture holds serious or sacred". At one point in the legend, a group of  disguised as a  troupe emerge to entertain the warriors. A fierce stare wards them off.

The general meaning of  "refers to all rituals related to agriculture and thus to fertility and regeneration". It could be simply described as a form of dance in which some people play musical instruments while dancing in various combinations. In the scene at villain's palace, the  also perform . The locations of the performances are similar. The angles of the buildings are the same. The postures and costumes are identical. The 's  lampoons the earlier and more wholesome dance at the shrine: the shrine performance is for the warriors' prayers to succeed in their mission whereas the  seeks to trick the warriors so to facilitate killing them.

 is described as being welcomed by all classes for its fund-raising capacity. A monk organized a  competition to raise funds for the building of a bridge. Those in attendance for the performance ranged from members of the imperial court down to commoners. All in attendance were fascinated by the  until the collapse of the reviewing stand claimed the lives of people of all backgrounds. This contrast between a fertility ritual and the deaths of innocent people is important to this carnivalesque event: it represents both destruction and renewal.

It could be said that this carnivalesque ritual leads to the demise of Shuten Dōji. The defeat of Shuten Dōji brings a time of peace in Japan with renewed imperial authority and additional recognition of the warrior class. From a carnivalesque point of view, the dance is both a dance of death and rebirth.

today 

The  Fire Festival is said to be one of Japan's three largest fire festivals. It is a part of the Kumano Nachi Shrine's annual festival and is officially called , or Fan Festival. This festival, held annually on July 14, is dedicated to the god in the precincts of Kumano Nachi Shrine.

The company ACT.JT performed a  dance on the terrace of Casa de Vacas in Madrid, spain with the participation of ten Spanish volunteers in a cultural exchange in 2017. This event was performed within the framework of the Spain-Japan Dual Year events.

References

Bibliography
Encyclopædia Britannica 2005 Ultimate Reference Suite DVD, article-"arts, East Asian"
Encyclopædia Britannica 2005 Ultimate Reference Suite DVD, article-"Kanami"
Encyclopedia of Shinto, article-"Saru-gaku, Den-gaku"

Festivals in Japan
Theatre in Japan
Japanese words and phrases